Theaker is a surname. Notable people with the surname include:

Cam Theaker (1912–1992), English footballer
Deborah Theaker (born 1964), Canadian actress
Raer Theaker (born 1997), Welsh gymnast
Thomas Clarke Theaker (1812–1883), American politician
Theaker Wilder, Irish professor